The Tour of Çanakkale was a professional road bicycle racing stage race held in and around the Çanakkale Province in Turkey. It was held once, in 2015 as a 2.2-rated event, and was won by Ahmet Akdilek.

Winners

General classification

Sprints classification

Mountains classification

Team classification

References

External links

Cycle races in Turkey
2015 establishments in Turkey
2015 disestablishments in Turkey
UCI Europe Tour races
Sport in Çanakkale
Recurring sporting events established in 2015
Recurring sporting events disestablished in 2015
Spring (season) events in Turkey